Christof Sielecki (born May 24, 1974) is a German chess International Master (IM) from Dinslaken, author of chess books, and YouTuber.

He regularly participates in Banter Blitz on the YouTube channel of Chess24.com under the username Chessexplained. He speaks German and English.
Sielecki reached his highest Elo rating of 2451 in December 2014 and again in March 2015.

Bibliography
 Christof Sielecki: Nimzo and Bogo Indian - Opening Repertoire, Everyman Chess, London, 2015, 
 Christof Sielecki: Keep it Simple 1.e4, New in Chess, Alkmaar, 2018,

References

External links
 
 
 
 

1974 births
Living people
German chess players
People from Wesel (district)
Sportspeople from Düsseldorf (region)